The second decade of the 21st century has continued to usher in new technologies and devices built on the technological foundation established in the previous decade. Technologically speaking, our personal devices and lives have evolved symbiotically, with the personal computer at the center of our daily communications, entertainment, and education. What has changed is accessibility and versatility; users can now perform the same functions and activities of their personal computer on a wide range of devices: smartphones, tablets, and even more recently, smart watches. The increase in personal computing capacity has a profound impact on the way people listen to, promote, and create music.

Digital music distribution is still the primary form of music consumption, with three main business models dominating the scene: subscription-based services, a-la-carte, and advertisement-based services (see 2000s in the music industry).

Digital music distributors 
There are currently five big players in the digital music distribution space: Spotify, Apple Inc, YouTube, Tidal, and Amazon (in order of number of users).

Spotify 
Launched out of Sweden in 2008, Spotify has become the leader of subscription-based digital music consumption with 40 million subscribers worldwide. They have a database of over 8 million songs and offer accessibility via a web, desktop, and mobile application. Spotify currently employs over 1,600 employees and operates as a private organization.

Pricing: $9.99 per month for single users, $4.99 per month for students, and $14.99 for families (up to 6).

Business model: subscription-based streaming.

Apple Inc

iTunes Music Store: 
Launched in 2003, the iTunes Music Store is the global leader in a-la-carte digital music downloads, with over 26 million songs being offered in their database as of September 2012.

Pricing: The iTunes music store has a three-tiered pricing system, with songs selling for either $.69, $.99, or $1.29 depending on popularity and demand.

Business model: a-la-carte downloads.

Apple Music 
Apple Inc. responded to the increasing demand for subscription-based streaming services (evident by Spotify's success) in June 2015, with the release of Apple Music. Operating in over 100 countries, Apple music offers users their own take on 24/7 radio stations and music suggestions: and "for you" and "new" tab managed by talented music experts.

Pricing: $9.99 per month for single users, and $14.99 for families (up to 6).

Business model: subscription-based streaming.

YouTube 
Launched in November 2015, YouTube Music is an app that allows users to search through their database of over 30 million audio tracks. But YouTube is also unique because it offers a breadth of concert footage/audio.

Pricing: The app is free, but has advertisements. For $9.99, users can subscribe to YouTube Red, which removes ads and adds offline access to the My Mix playlist. The latter incorporates both tracks the user has listened to and new suggestions. 

Business model: advertisement/subscription-based streaming.

Tidal 
Originally launched in 2014, Tidal was founded from Norwegian/Swedish public company Aspiro. In 2015, Jay-Z acquired Aspiro and rebranded Tidal, stating that it was the first digital music streaming service by artists; in 2015 Tidal held a press conference where sixteen big-name music artists (like Daft Punk, Kanye West, Madonna) announced that they were partial owners, and held a stake in Tidal. Tidal currently claims to have 42 million paying subscribers.

Pricing: Tidal premium (the first tier option) is priced at $9.99 per month while the Tidal HiFi (second tier) is priced at $19.99 and gives users access to higher quality tracks known as "high fidelity, lossless audio" which come in the form of FLAC.

Business model: subscription-based streaming.

Amazon 
Launched as a beta in 2007, Amazon Music is a digital music streaming service that combines the a-la-carte and subscription based payment models; users can download or stream songs. Included with an Amazon prime membership, the Amazon Music catalog currently consists of 29,157,740 songs.

Pricing: Amazon Prime subscribers are given access to part of the music library, and can unlock full access by paying either $8 a month, or $79 per year. Non Amazon-Prime users can pay the industry standard of $10 per month, and there is a $4 per month option for users who exclusively listen through Amazon's Echo speaker.

Business model: subscription-based streaming + a-la-carte downloads.

Exclusive releases
Recently, the music industry has seen another consistent decline in album sales in response to the rising popularity of streaming services. As a result, music superstars have been trying a new method for increasing album profits: exclusively releasing their music on a specific digital music distributor. 2016 saw exclusive album releases from music superstars such as Drake, Kanye West, Frank Ocean, Beyoncé, Rihanna, Future & Coldplay. Drake's latest release, Views, was exclusively released on Apple Music and set a first-week streaming record at 250 million times worldwide, in addition to 1 million albums sold – breaking Justin Bieber's streaming record of 205 million times within the album Purpose'''s first week of release on Spotify (which has 5 times the subscribers as Apple Music).

On the business side, exclusive releases can help digital music conglomerates attract a significant number on new subscribers (depending on the artist) as well as free promotion for the firm. On the other side of the equation, the artist is paid a nominal fee in addition to the streaming revenue.

Exclusive streaming may be on the way out just as quickly as it appeared. Record labels have begun to realize that exclusively releasing through one or two streaming services could stunt the long-term growth in subscription music. The upfront fee may be enticing to struggling labels in the short term, but may hurt their overall sales and streaming while the streaming services themselves benefit much more from the PR, new users, and streaming itself.

Following the release of Frank Ocean's exclusive release of his album Blonde, Lucian Grainge, CEO of Universal Music Group banned exclusive distribution with streaming services by UMG artists.

But exclusive releases are still poised to benefit both the artists themselves, and the streaming service. It is possible that the practice will continue from superstar artists who record and release music from their own labels (like Frank Ocean did with Blonde). This would be yet another reason for artists to leave their labels; they would reap more financial benefits in cutting out the labels.

 Crowdfunding 
"Rewards based crowdfunding is a collective effort involving a group of people (the crowd, contributors, backers) and a project creator (project owner or campaign manager) to fund a specific venture. The creator of that venture requests from the crowd to contribute small amounts of capital to fund his or her new concept (many of them from his or her immediate social network), which is usually hosted from an internet-based platform. In return for the crowd's contributions, rewards or perks are offered to the contributors from the project itself." Rewards based crowd funding has become increasingly popular within the education, sports, video games, retail, and music industries.

 Remote music collaboration 
Thanks to the advent of technology (and the digitalization of music recording and distribution), more and more music artists have started to collaborate online as a method for overcoming the physical distance between artists. The music industry has seen more remote music collaboration on the recording side of music in particular; the standard for recording music is digital, and individual audio tracks are easily transferable over the web. It is important to note that some people do prefer the classic way of recording in analog as a way of capturing a specific timbre. But even when people record music in analog, audio tracks can still be digitized and shared the same way.

 Example 
One example of remote music collaboration for music recording is the band Good Tiger for their debut album, "A Head Full of Moonlight". "With members in various locations throughout the globe, "A Head Full of Moonlight''" was pieced together internationally by a selection of exceptionally talented individuals. Guitars and bass were recorded at Dez's own studio, Playgle Productions. Vocals were tracked both in Los Angeles with Brandon Paddock (Avril Lavigne, Black Veil Brides, Daughtry) and Washington DC (with Dez). Drums were captured in the British countryside at Middle Farm Studios with Adam 'Nolly' Getgood of Periphery fame. Finally, the record was co-mixed by Dez and Nolly, with mastering by Kris Crummett at Interlace Audio."

Applications 
Remote music collaboration has also created many new possibilities on both the performance, and educational side of the music industry as well. Right now there are two desktop applications available for the digital musician: LOLA and Ultragrid. 
 LOLA (standing for low-latency) operates strictly on Window's PCs, and utilizes a low-latency sound adopter for sounds around 6ms. Musician Institutes all around the world have begun to utilize LOLA as way of enabling musicians in different locations, to play music together in real-time.
 Ultragrid is an open source application that operates on Mac, PC, and Linux operating systems, with a focus in the transmission of HD audio and video streams in order to enable live, cyber performances.

A 2016 study looked into the efficiency of LOLA and Ultragrid for remote music collaboration. The study concluded that a delay between 15ms and 30ms is necessary in order to play music together, remotely. The research also found the following metrics to be important for live, remote music collaboration: quality of sound capture & reproduction, volume, dynamics, space, and echo.

References

2010s in music
2010s decade overviews